McKinley Grove is a small, isolated giant sequoia grove located about  southeast of Dinkey Creek in the Kings River watershed of Sierra National Forest, California.

The grove hosts between 150 and 200 large trees. Parts of the grove were logged in the 1980s, though the heart of the grove remains largely untouched. A short paved path winds through a cluster of about 20 giant sequoias with an open understory of dogwood resembling that of the Giant Forest grove of Sequoia National Park. The grove also features a large fallen giant sequoia.

History
The grove was originally called "Washington Grove" after the 1st president of the United States George Washington. The grove was later named Dusy Grove, after a colourful local settler. Later, the grove was named after the 25th president, William McKinley.

See also
List of giant sequoia groves
Courtright Reservoir
Dinkey Lakes Wilderness
John Muir Wilderness

References

Giant sequoia groves